Good Things is the fourth studio album by American country pop duo Dan + Shay. It was released on August 13, 2021, through Warner Bros. Records Nashville. The production is primarily handled by duo member Dan Smyers, who produced every track, with additional production from Jason Evigan, Scott Hendricks, and Jordan Reynolds. The album includes the singles "10,000 Hours" (a duet with Canadian singer Justin Bieber), "I Should Probably Go to Bed", "Glad You Exist", "Steal My Love", and "You".

Release and promotion
On July 14, 2021, Dan + Shay announced that a special announcement would be made the following day, with the header, "good things are coming". The following day, the album was announced with the cover, tracklist, and pre-order, along with the title and opening track being released as a promotional single. The official music video debuted five hours after the song, on July 16, 2021. "Lying" was released on July 29, 2021 as the album's second and final promotional single.

Singles
The album's lead single, "10,000 Hours", a collaboration with Canadian singer Justin Bieber, was released on October 4, 2019. The song was solely produced by Dan Smyers. The official music video premiered on the duo's YouTube channel the same day. The song peaked at number 4 on the Billboard Hot 100 and peaked at number 2 on the Canadian Hot 100. It was certified 3× platinum by the Recording Industry Association of America (RIAA) and certified 5× platinum by Music Canada.

The second single, "I Should Probably Go to Bed", their first release of 2020, was released on July 31, 2020. The song was solely produced by Smyers and an acoustic version was released on October 14, 2020. The official music video and the lyric video debuted alongside the song. The song peaked at number 28 on the Billboard Hot 100. It was certified platinum by the RIAA.

The third single, "Glad You Exist", their first release of 2021, was released on February 5, 2021. The song was solely produced by Smyers and an acoustic version was released on April 15, 2021. The lyric video debuted alongside the song. The song peaked at number 35 on the Billboard Hot 100. It was certified gold by the RIAA.

The title track and "Lying" were released in July 2021 as promotional singles ahead of the album. "Steal My Love" was released to country radio on August 16, 2021 as the fourth single off the album.

Track listing

Notes
  signifies a co-producer.
  signifies a vocal producer.
 "Lying" interpolates "Lean on Me", written and performed by Bill Withers.

Personnel

Dan + Shay

 Dan Smyers – vocals , production , programming , songwriting , vocal recording , acoustic guitar , piano , strings , recording , synthesizing , transcribing , bass , drums , electric guitar , engineering 
 Shay Mooney – vocals , songwriting

Other musicians and technical

 Jeff Juliano – mixing 
 Andrew Mendelson – mastering 
 Jason Evigan – production , songwriting , programming , synthesizing 
 Ashley Gorley – songwriting 
 Ross Copperman – songwriting 
 Abby Smyers – background vocals 
 Bryan Sutton – acoustic guitar , mandolin , dobro , resonator guitar 
 Derek Wells – electric guitar 
 Jimmie Lee Sloas – bass 
 Gordon Mote – piano , Hammond B3 organ 
 Nir Z – drums , percussion 
 Brian David Willis – digital editing 
 Ryan Yount – engineering assistant , recording assistant 
 Dave Cook – mixing assistant 
 Eric Kirkland – mixing assistant 
 Jeff Balding – recording , engineering 
 Lionel Crasta – recording 
 Rafael Fadul – recording 
 Andy Albert – songwriting 
 Jordan Reynolds – songwriting , programming , co-production , bass , electric guitar , piano , synthesizing , recording , acoustic guitar 
 Ilya Toshinsky – acoustic guitar , ukulele 
 Dave Barnes – songwriting 
 Scott Hendricks – production , recording 
 Joel McKenney – mixing assistant 
 Wendy Moten – background vocals 
 Jason Eskridge – background vocals 
 Kyla Jade – background vocals 
 Robert Bailey – background vocals 
 Samson White – background vocals 
 Vicki Hampton – background vocals 
 Lauren Adams – recording assistant 
 Tate Sablatura – recording assistant , engineering assistant 
 Shawn Mendes – songwriting 
 Scott Harris – songwriting 
 Julia Michaels – songwriting , background vocals 
 Mike Rinne – bass 
 Nick Gold – cello 
 Una O'Riordan – cello 
 Charlie Judge – string arrangement 
 Allison Gooding Hoffman – violin 
 Christina McGann – violin 
 Johna Smith – violin 
 Louise Morrison – violin 
 Charles Dixon – viola , contracting , copying 
 Betsy Lamb – viola 
 Michael Walter – recording assistant 
 Aubrey Haynie – fiddle 
 Bill Withers – songwriting 
 Jordan Schmidt – songwriting 
 Kyle Fishman – songwriting 
 Brandon Tursi – songwriting 
 Craig Nelson – bass 
 Kevin Bate – cello 
 Jung-Min Shin – violin 
 Mary Kathryn Von Osdale – violin 
 Alan Umstead – contracting 
 Nick Spezia – recording 
 Tayla Parx – songwriting 
 Ryan Lewis – songwriting 
 Josh Ditty – additional engineering 
 Justin Bieber – vocals , songwriting 
 Poo Bear – songwriting 
 Jessie Jo Dillon – songwriting 
 Josh Gudwin – vocal production , additional engineering 
 Chris "TEK" O'Ryan – additional vocal recording engineering

Charts

Weekly charts

Year-end charts

Certifications

Release history

References

2021 albums
Dan + Shay albums
Warner Records albums
Albums produced by Jason Evigan
Albums produced by Scott Hendricks